Admiral Zachary (variously Zacharia or Zechariah) Mudge (22 January 1770 – 22 October 1852) was an officer in the British Royal Navy, best known for serving in the historic Vancouver Expedition.

Family background
Mudge was one of 20 children of the noted physician, Dr. John Mudge, of Plymouth; his mother was John's third wife, Elizabeth. Mudge's grandfather was clergyman Zachariah Mudge. The family included distinguished surveyors and mathematicians. His older half-brother was William Mudge, who developed the Ordnance Survey and was responsible for much of the early detailed mapping of Britain. His uncle Thomas Mudge was a famous horologist. In addition, the family was connected to the politically powerful Pitt family.

Early naval career
Mudge entered the Navy on 1 November 1780 as a captain's servant aboard the 80-gun ship , under the command of Captain John Jervis. He was aboard on 21 April 1782 when she captured, after an action of nearly an hour, the 74-gun .

On 20 January 1790, he returned to the Perseus, Captain John Gibson, on the Irish and Channel stations.

Vancouver Expedition

On 15 December 1790, Mudge joined  as second lieutenant; after the Nootka Crisis, he became her first lieutenant and George Vancouver captain. In addition to his other duties, Mudge had been asked to look after the 16-year-old (and future Baron) Thomas Pitt, but was compelled to flog him when the latter used ship stores to purchase romantic favours in Tahiti.

In 1791, they voyaged to Tenerife, Cape Town, Australia, New Zealand, Hawaii and North America. In 1792, they spent a season of exploring the west coast of America, and then put into Nootka Sound to implement the Nootka Sound Convention.

The British and Spanish commanders had been given conflicting instructions, and the primary purpose of the mission could not be completed. Vancouver therefore sent Mudge back to England with dispatches, botanical samples and a request for further orders. He crossed the Pacific to China in the Portuguese-flagged trading vessel Fenis and St. Joseph, a 50-foot open boat carrying 14 men, and from there proceeded home in the Lord Macartney East Indiaman.

On 8 February 1794, Mudge joined  as first lieutenant, under William Robert Broughton. They were sent to assist Vancouver but, reaching Monterey, determined that he had left for England. They then surveyed the east coast of Asia.

Later career
Mudge's career advancement had suffered from being away for more than six years. However, through the intercession of Lady Camelford (Pitt's mother), he was promoted to commander on 24 November 1797, and on 8 November 1798 he obtained command of the 16-gun sloop  on the North America station. He captured the French privateer cutters Glaneur (5 February 1799) and Trompeur (30 August 1800), in the English Channel, but almost lost his ship in an encounter with an immense iceberg during a passage home from Halifax with despatches from the Commander-in-Chief the Duke of Kent.

Mudge was promoted to post-captain on 15 November 1800, and on 1 April 1801 was appointed to command of sixth-rate . In early 1801, he received the thanks of the British merchants and consuls at Lisbon and Oporto for safely convoying a fleet from Falmouth to Portugal, and also for vessels at Viana, laden with brandy, which he escorted back to England. He also captured the Spanish cutter El Duides, of 8 guns and 69 men, and the privateer lugger Venture, of 2 guns and 27 men, on 7 and 8 June 1801, while off Vigo. Two days later, on 10 June, he captured the merchant ship Wilhelm Georg Frederic, and in July, with the assistance of the sloop , captured El Cantara, a Spanish privateer of 22 guns and 110 men, and her consort, a 10 gun lugger, near Cape Ortegal. Constance was subsequently engaged in conveying foreign soldiers from Lymington to the Elbe.

On 23 September 1802, he was given command of the fifth rate , and at the end of 1803, was employed at the blockade of Saint-Domingue, where he captured or destroyed 24 enemy vessels in less than a month. Further captures included the French privateer Les Deux Amis, taken on 15 September 1804, in company with the sloop , the French schooner  captured in October 1804, and Amitie in June 1805, each of 14 guns, and also the 4-gun Dutch schooner Nimrod, the 3-gun French privateer Hazard, as well as a large number of merchantmen.

On 15 July 1805 Blanche encountered a French squadron consisting of the 40-gun French frigate , the 22-gun corvette Department des Landes, the 18-gun , and the 16-gun brig-corvette . Blanche resisted bravely, but she was reduced to a wreck.  Mudge ordered her colours struck and she sank sometime later after the French set fire to her. Mudge was court-martialled on the question whether he had made his best defence; he was not only acquitted, but complimented for "very able and gallant" conduct.

From 18 November 1805 to May 1810 he commanded  in the Bay of Biscay and at Lisbon. In her he captured the merchant Danish brig Kiellestadt in November 1806, and the Vigilante in October 1807, and also the French warships Agile on 29 May 1809, and Charles on 29 January 1810.

Mudge's last command was of the 74-gun  on the Brazilian station from July 1814 to August 1815. He saw no further active service, but was promoted to rear-admiral on 22 July 1830, to vice-admiral on 23 November 1841, and to admiral on 15 September 1849. He died at Plympton on 26 October 1852.

Legacy
Cape Mudge on Quadra Island is named for Zachary Mudge; he was the first European to sight it from a nearby mountain.

The Memoirs of the Mudge family was printed in 1883 in an edition of only 100 copies, edited by Stamford Raffles Flint. Mainly concerning Mudge's grandfather, theologian Zachariah Mudge, it also contains an account of Zachary Mudge's naval career.

In 1855 a memorial window to Zachary Mudge (the "Mudge Window") was placed in St Andrew's Church, Plymouth, England.

References

Bibliography

 
 

Royal Navy admirals
1770 births
1852 deaths
Military personnel from Plymouth, Devon
English explorers of North America
Explorers of British Columbia
Royal Navy personnel of the American Revolutionary War
Royal Navy personnel of the French Revolutionary Wars
Royal Navy personnel of the Napoleonic Wars